Iris II or Iris 2 or variants may refer to:
 HMS Iris II, Royal Navy ship
 , cargo ship in service 1963-67
 IRIS II, bulk carrier 224-m long, IMO:9286906 
 Abraham AS-2 Iris II, Abraham airplane of 1930s France
 Blackburn Iris II, variant of the Blackburn Iris airplane
 Iris II (album), 1987 album by Romanian rock band Iris
 Iris II: New Generation, a  South Korean TV series, also known as Iris II
 IRIS², a planned EU satellite constellation
 the 1968 satellite ESRO 2B, also known as Iris 2

See also 
 Iris (disambiguation)